Ski jumping at the 1992 Winter Olympics consisted of three events held from 9 February to 16 February, taking place at Tremplin du Praz.

Medal summary

Medal table

Finland led the medal table with two golds, while Austria won the most medals with five, including sweeping the silver medals.

Events

Participating NOCs
Seventeen nations participated in ski jumping at the Albertville Games. Slovenia and the Unified Team made their Olympic ski jumping debuts.

References

 
1992 Winter Olympics events
1992
1992 in ski jumping
Ski jumping competitions in France